Cordell Hull Institute is an independent Washington, D.C. based think tank.

Founded in 1998 by Harald Malmgren and former Secretary of State Lawrence Eagleburger, the institute is named for former Secretary of State Cordell Hull.

References

Think tanks established in 1998
Political and economic think tanks in the United States
Organizations based in Washington, D.C.
501(c)(3) organizations